St James' Church is the parish church of Brownhills, Clayhanger and Ogley Hay in the West Midlands, England. It is an active place of worship serving the town of Brownhills and the suburbs of Clayhanger and Ogley Hay. The church is not a grade listed building but it serves as a place for the local community for worship, events and other functions.

References

Buildings and structures in Walsall
Church of England church buildings in the West Midlands (county)